Abdou Salam Baco (born  1965) is a Mahoraisan writer. He was born in Mzoizia in Mayotte. He has written three books, and founded the musical group Mobissa.

External links
 Biography 

French male novelists
People from Mayotte
1960s births
Living people
Year of birth uncertain
French male musicians